America is a 2011 Puerto Rican drama film directed by Sonia Fritz based on a published fiction novel El Sueño de America (1996) by Puerto Rican author Esmeralda Santiago. The film was selected as the Puerto Rican entry for the Best Foreign Language Film at the 84th Academy Awards, but was disqualified because of a rule change.

Cast
 Lymari Nadal as America
 Yancey Arias as Correa
 Yareli Arizmendi as Maria
 Talia Rothenberg as Rosalinda
 Marisé Alvarez as Elena
 Teresa Hernández as Paulina
 Eyra Aguero Joubert as Lourdes
 Edward James Olmos as Mr. Irving
 Frank Perozo as Dario
 Tony Plana as Leopoldo
 Isaac Santiago as NYC Cop#1
 Monica Steuer as Karen Leverett
 Rachel Ticotin as Esther

See also
 List of submissions to the 84th Academy Awards for Best Foreign Language Film
 List of Puerto Rican submissions for the Academy Award for Best Foreign Language Film

References

External links
 

2011 films
2011 drama films
2010s Spanish-language films
Puerto Rican films